On the night of 27–28 May 2001 a coup attempt was carried out by commandos of the Central African Armed Forces who attempted to overthrow Ange-Félix Patassé. The coup attempt failed, but violence continued in the capital over the following days.

The coup was sponsored by André Kolingba and had the effect of dividing the country's armed forces into two opposing camps: one that supported Patassé and the other that supported François Bozizé.

See also
Central African Republic Bush War
Central African Republic Civil War

References

Central African Republic coup d'état attempt
Central African Republic coup d'état attempt, 2001
Military coups in the Central African Republic
Central African Republic coup d'état attempt
Central African Republic coup d'état attempt
Coup d'état attempt
Attempted coups d'état in the Central African Republic